Gawdy may refer to:

Bassingbourne Gawdy (died 1590), English member of parliament
Bassingbourne Gawdy (died 1606) (1560–1606), English member of parliament
Framlingham Gawdy (1589–1654), English member of parliament
Francis Gawdy (died 1605), English judge
Henry Gawdy (c. 1553 – 1621), English member of parliament
Philip Gawdy (1562-1617), English member of parliament
Thomas Gawdy (died 1588), English lawyer and member of parliament
Thomas Gawdy (died 1556), English member of parliament 
William Gawdy (1612–1669), 1st Baronet of the Gawdy baronets of West Harling (1663), English politician 
Gawdy baronets, either of two baronetcies created for members of the Gawdy family in the 17th century, each of which became extinct in the early 18th century